Frederick William Cook (1880–1934) was an English footballer who played as a goalkeeper in the Football League for West Bromwich Albion and in the Southern League for Northampton Town and Portsmouth.

References

1880 births
1934 deaths
English footballers
Association football goalkeepers
English Football League players
Northampton Town F.C. players
West Bromwich Albion F.C. players
Portsmouth F.C. players
Southern Football League players